The silvered bat (Glauconycteris argentata) is a species of vesper bat in the family Vespertilionidae. It is found in Angola, Burundi, Cameroon, Republic of the Congo, Democratic Republic of the Congo, Equatorial Guinea, Kenya, Malawi, Rwanda, and Tanzania. Its natural habitats are subtropical or tropical moist lowland forests and moist savanna.

References

Glauconycteris
Taxa named by George Edward Dobson
Mammals described in 1875
Bats of Africa
Taxonomy articles created by Polbot